Marines Football Club (Thai สโมสรฟุตบอลนาวิกโยธิน) is a Thai semi-professional football club based in Chonburi Province. The club currently plays in the Thai League 3 Eastern region.

Stadiums and locations

Season by season record

Players

Current squad

Honours
 Thai League 4 Eastern Region
 Runner-up: 2017
Regional League Central-East Division
 Runner-up: 2014
Khǒr Royal Cup (ถ้วย ข.)
Winner (2) : 2006, 2009

References

External links
 

Association football clubs established in 2011
Football clubs in Thailand
Rayong province
2011 establishments in Thailand